The Government of the Hong Kong Special Administrative Region, commonly known as the Hong Kong Government or HKSAR Government, is the executive authorities of Hong Kong. It was formed on 1 July 1997 in accordance with the Sino-British Joint Declaration of 1983, an international treaty lodged at the United Nations. This government replaced the former British Hong Kong Government (1842–1997). The Chief Executive and the principal officials, nominated by the chief executive, are appointed by the State Council of the People's Republic of China. The Government Secretariat is headed by the Chief Secretary of Hong Kong, who is the most senior principal official of the Government. The Chief Secretary and the other secretaries jointly oversee the administration of Hong Kong, give advice to the Chief Executive as members of the Executive Council, and are accountable for their actions and policies to the Chief Executive and the Legislative Council.

Under the "one country, two systems" constitutional principle, the Government is, in law, exclusively in charge of Hong Kong's internal affairs and external relations. The Government of the People's Republic of China (PRC), of which the Hong Kong government is financially independent from, is responsible for Hong Kong SAR's defence and foreign policy, while decisions made by the Standing Committee of the National People's Congress override any territorial judicial process. Despite gradually evolving, the overall governmental structure was inherited from British Hong Kong.

Head of government

The Chief Executive is the head of the Region and head of government of Hong Kong. The Basic Law designates a system of governance led by a Chief Executive and an Executive Council, under the principles of separation of powers, with a two-tiered system of semi-representative government and an independent judiciary. The Chief Executive is elected by an Election Committee, a 1500-member electoral college consisting of individuals and bodies (i.e. special interest groups) elected within 40 functional constituencies defined in the Basic Law. The winner is then appointed to the position by the Premier of the People's Republic of China. The Chief Executive is responsible for implementing the Basic Law, signing bills and budgets, promulgating laws, making decisions on government policies, and issuing Executive Orders.  The Chief Executive, Carrie Lam, began exercise of her unfettered residual powers of law-making by decree on 4 October 2019, under the Emergency Regulations Ordinance, Chapter 241 of the Laws of Hong Kong, bypassing the legislature.

As of 1 July 1997, the Chief Executive of Hong Kong officially replaced the Governor of Hong Kong as the head of the government for Hong Kong following the transfer of sovereignty. The Chief Executive is assisted by the Chief Secretary for Administration and the Financial Secretary, and other secretaries who heads policy bureaus. The secretaries for each government affairs are appointed by the State Council of China on the nomination of the Chief Executive. The Secretary for Justice (SJ) is responsible for legal matters of the government and prosecution for criminal cases in the territory. The Independent Commission Against Corruption and Audit Commission report directly to the Chief Executive. The current Chief Executive is John Lee.

Executive

Executive Council

The Executive Council decides on matters of policy, the introduction of bills to the Legislative Council and the drafting of subordinate legislation. The Council consists of 21 principal officials and 16 non-official members. All members are appointed by the Chief Executive from among the senior officials of the executive authorities, members of the Legislative Council, and other influential public personnels. They serve for a period no longer than the expiry of the Chief Executive's term of office.

Principal officials
In a system popularly called the Principal Officials Accountability System introduced by then Chief Executive Tung Chee Hwa in July 2002, all principal officials, including the Chief Secretary, Financial Secretary, Secretary for Justice, heads of government bureaux and the Director of the Chief Executive's Office would no longer be politically neutral career civil servants, but would all be political appointees chosen by the Chief Executive from within or outside the civil service. The system was portrayed as the key to solve previous administrative problems, notably the co-operation of high-ranking civil servants with the Chief Executive.

Under the new system, there are 3 Secretaries of Department and 13 Directors of Bureaux. The system is aimed at raising the accountability of the civil service, so the political appointees are responsible for all their job aspects and will step down if they make any failure. All heads of bureaux became members of the Executive Council, and came directly under the Chief Executive instead of the Chief Secretary or the Financial Secretary.

Deputy ministers and political assistants

The government released a report on the Further Development of the Political Appointment System on 17 October 2007. Two new layers, Deputy Directors of Bureaux and Assistants to Directors (AD) would be added to the political appointments. Each Director of Bureau will be assisted by the two new appointees and constitute the political team, who would ostensibly work closely with bureau secretaries and top civil servants in implementing the Chief Executive's policy agenda in an executive-led government. As with the principal officials, these two new posts may be drawn from within or outside the civil service, and appointees may or may not have a political background.

Eight new Under-secretaries were named on 20 May, and nine Political Assistant appointments were announced on 22 May 2008. By the administration's own admission, the announcements were poorly handled, and there was widespread criticism of several key aspects, namely the nationality and experience of appointees, the transparency of the recruitment process and the level of officials' salaries.

Chief Secretary for Administration

The Chief Secretary for Administration is responsible for assisting the Chief Executive in the supervision of policy bureaux and plays a key role in ensuring harmony in policy formulation and implementation. The current Secretary is Chan Kwok-ki.

Financial Secretary

The Financial Secretary is responsible for preparing the Government Budget in accordance with the Chief Executive's agenda in the policy address, ensuring fiscal policies are in accordance to the Public Finance Ordinance. The secretary has to estimate of revenue and expenditure before the Legislative Council each year, and to deliver an annual budget to the Legislative Council, outlining the government's budgetary proposals and moving the appropriation bills. The current FS is Paul Chan Mo-po.

Secretary for Justice 

The Secretary for Justice is responsible for prosecutions and legal matters and heads the Department of Justice. The current Secretary for Justice is Teresa Cheng.

Policy bureaux (ministries) and government departments

The hierarchical structure of the government secretariat and government departments in Chief Executive John Lee's administration since 1 July 2022 is as follows:

Office of the Chief Executive
The Office of the Chief Executive is responsible for ensuring the Chief Executive receives the best advice and support for formulating and co-ordinating policies. It is headed by the Director of the Chief Executive's Office, who would sit in meetings of the Executive Council.

The Policy Innovation and Co-ordination Office, Independent Commission Against Corruption, Audit Commission, Office of the Ombudsman and Public Service Commission report to the Chief Executive directly.

Chief Secretary for Administration’s Office
The Human Resources Planning and Poverty Co-ordination Office, Administration Wing and Legal Aid Department are under the Chief Secretary for Administration's Office.

Financial Secretary's Office
The Office of the Government Economist and the Hong Kong Monetary Authority are under the Financial Secretary's Office.

Department of Justice
The Department of Justice is led by the Secretary for Justice (Hong Kong) (Legal Department and Attorney General before the transfer of sovereignty). The Secretary for Justice (SJ) is responsible for all prosecutions in Hong Kong, drafting all government legislation, and advising other policy bureaux and departments of the government on a vast array of legal issues.

The department consists of the Prosecutions Division, the Civil Division, the Legal Policy Division, the Law Drafting Division, the International Law Division and the Administration and Development Division.

Policy Bureaux
The current fifteen policy bureaux is a result of the 2022 government reorganisation, which added, expanded, and re-titled several bureaux. Currently, nine bureaux reports to the Chief Secretary for Administration, and the other six reports to the Financial Secretary. The Chief Secretary for Administration is customarily considered to be the leader of the bureaux.

Civil Service Bureau
Constitutional and Mainland Affairs Bureau
Culture, Sports and Tourism Bureau (newly established)
Education Bureau
Environment and Ecology Bureau (re-titled from the Environment Bureau and takes over the Food and Health Bureau except health)
Health Bureau (takes over health policies from the defunct Food and Health Bureau) 
Home and Youth Affairs Bureau (reorganised from the Home Affairs Bureau)
Labour and Welfare Bureau
Security Bureau
Commerce and Economic Development Bureau
Development Bureau
Financial Services and the Treasury Bureau
Housing Bureau (split from the defunct Transport and Housing Bureau)
Innovation, Technology and Industry Bureau (re-titled from the Innovation and Technology Bureau)
Transport and Logistics Bureau (split from the defunct Transport and Housing Bureau)

Departments and agencies

See also 
 Politburo Standing Committee of the Chinese Communist Party
 Hong Kong Liaison Office
 Chinese Communist Party
 Hong Kong Civil Service
 Legislative Council
 District Councils
 Hong Kong government officials
 Hong Kong politicians
 Government Hill
 Central Government Complex
 Principal Officials Accountability System
 United Front Work Department

References

External links 
 GovHK – One-stop Portal of the HKSAR Government
 Government and Related Organisations
 Government official news
 Organisation Chart of the Government
 HKSAR Government Telephone Directory

 
 
Politics of Hong Kong